Khmelnytskyi, until 1954 Proskuriv,  is a city in western Ukraine, the administrative center for Khmelnytskyi Oblast (region) and Khmelnytskyi Raion (district). It hosts the administration of the Khmelnytskyi urban hromada.  Khmelnytskyi is located in the historic region of Podolia on the banks of the Buh River. The city received its current local government designation in 1941. The current city's population is estimated , making it the second largest city of the former, archaic Podolia region after Vinnytsia and the largest city of the western part of the region.

History

The city foundation date is uncertain. The territory where Khmelnytskyi is situated has been inhabited for a very long time. Many archaeological discoveries have been made in the city suburbs. For example, to the East of Lezneve district, there was a settlement from the Bronze Age 2000 B.C., and from Scythian times from 7–3 century B.C. The first mention of the city was written with Cyrillic alphabet. The earliest known mention in historical sources was in 1431, when it was known as Płoskirów (Ploskirov, Плоскиров) and was part of the Kingdom of Poland. It was a royal city.

Polish rule was briefly interrupted by Ottoman one between 1672 and 1699. During this period, it was nahiya centre in Mejibuji sanjak in Podolia Eyalet as Poloskiruf. After the Second Partition of Poland in 1793, the city was annexed by the Russian Empire and was renamed Proskurov. According to the Russian census of 1897, Proskurov with a population of 22,855 was the fifth largest city of Podolia after Kamianets-Podilskyi, Uman, Vinnytsia and Balta. In 1920 it became part of Soviet Ukraine. In 1954 the city was finally renamed Khmelnytskyi (Хмельницький) in the honor of the 300th anniversary of a treaty negotiated by Bohdan Khmelnytsky.

After new archival sources presented at the 2006 conference City of Khmelnytskyi in the Context of Ukrainian History post-dated the city’s earliest mention from 1493 to 1431, it changed its official 513th anniversary commemoration to its 575th.

Pogroms
A series of anti-Jewish pogroms have been carried out in the region, known together as the Proskurov pogrom. According to Vinnytsia's city archives, the pogrom was conducted on the Friday night of February 15, 1919, by one of the otamans (generals) of the Ukrainian People's Army, Otaman Semysenko (also rendered as Semesenko). Estimates vary as to the number of victims, some putting the death toll at 1,500 Jews in Proskurov alone, with 600 more killed in nearby Filshtein.

The Chief Otaman Petliura had been appointed head of state just two days prior to the tragedy, on February the 13th. Petliura issued Order 131 in which he mentioned the fact that numerous Jewish parties in Ukraine (Bund, Poale Zion, Folks-Partei, Unificationists) rose to defend the sovereignty of the Ukrainian Republic and were cooperating with the Ukrainian government. He condemned such pogroms, calling those initiating them deserters and enemies of the State that must be liquidated. The order was co-signed by the Chief of Staff, Otaman Yunakiv. The order was published in the Ukraina newspaper on February 20 (March 4, old style). Later, Petliura issued a special order to execute Semysenko for being the pogrom initiator. According  to sources the order was carried out on March 20, 1920. Other sources claim that he was released.

During the Schwartzbard trial, at the end of which Petliura's assassin was pardoned on the grounds of self-trail (revenge), the main argument of the defense was that Schwartzbard had acted as an avenger of the Jews killed in pogroms perpetrated during Petliura's rule.

World War II

The town was occupied by the German Army from July 8, 1941 to March 25, 1944. On November 4, 1941, 5300 Jewish inhabitants of the town and surrounding villages were shot by an Einsatzgruppe. A ghetto was formed on December 14, 1941, where all surviving Jewish inhabitants had to resettle and were subjected to forced labor. They were subsequently killed in the fall of 1942. More than 9500 Jews were killed in the town in total.

After World War II
Khmelnytskyi was home to the 19th Division of the 43rd Rocket Army of the Soviet Strategic Rocket Forces during the Cold War. The intercontinental ballistic missile silos of the division that were housed there were removed and destroyed, partially with U.S. Cooperative Threat Reduction funding, during the 1990s.

Until 18 July 2020, Khmelnytskyi was incorporated as a city of oblast significance and served as the administrative center of Khmelnytskyi Raion though it did not belong to the raion. In July 2020, as part of the administrative reform of Ukraine, which reduced the number of raions of Khmelnytskyi Oblast to three, the city of Khmelnytskyi was merged into Khmelnytskyi Raion.

2022 Russian Invasion of Ukraine
Main articles: 2022 Russian Invasion of Ukraine and 2022 Russian strikes against Ukrainian infrastructure

The Russian forces did not attack Khmelnitskyi during the first 7 months of the invasion.

On 10 October 2022 however, the city has been targeted by Russian cruise missiles, causing a blackout in the city and limiting water supply.

During a missile attack on 31 December a gas station and a military facility inside the city have been hit by 2 Russian cruise missiles, wounding 10 civilians, causing a partial blackout and damaging more than a dozen cars and several residential buildigs, including a kindergarten. 8 of the 10 wounded had to be hospitalized with 2 being in a critical condition.

Geography and natural resources

Khmelnytskyi is the regional center of the Khmelnytskyi region which is located in the western part of Ukraine in the middle of Podillia, its total area makes up . Khmelnytskyi has a favorable geographical position.
Khmelnytskyi is crossed by one of the longest rivers of Ukraine – the Southern Bug. Coincidentally, through the western portion of the city flows the small river Ploska.

The climate of Khmelnytskyi is moderately continental.

The most abundant make up for the ground in Khmelnytskyi are layers of the following overburden: loess and loess-type rocks. The ground-climatic conditions of Khmelnytskyi are favorable for the cultivation of winter wheat and rye, sugar beet, potato and other crops. Khmelnytskyi is also ideal for the development of gardening and vegetable growing. In the territory of Khmelnytskyi there are the vegetations of two geobotanical zones of Ukraine: Polissya and forest-steppe. Khmelnytskyi and its greater region supplies many rock products, particularly building materials such as limestone, plaster, chalk, tripoli powder, crystal layers (granites, gneisses), sand, sandstones, and also graphite, saponite, kaolin, phosphorite, lithographic stone, and roofing slate. There are also deposits of peat, bitumen, shale, and oil.

Demographics
According to a 2017 survey, 84% of the population are ethnic Ukrainians and 13% are Russians.

The average life expectancy of its inhabitants is 65 years for men, and 75 years for women.

Education
Khmelnytskyi hosts 6 universities, 2 academies, 3 institutes, 12 colleges, 4 technical schools and 15 representative offices of other Ukrainian HEIs.

Transport

Khmelnytskyi has infrastructure for transportation connections with Moscow, Prague, Bratislava, Warsaw, Budapest, Belgrade and all major Ukrainian cities. The distance from Khmelnytskyi to Kyiv by railway is estimated to be , by highway it is estimated to be . The highways Kyiv-Lviv, Odessa-Lviv and Chernivtsi-Kyiv pass through Khmelnytskyi. The city is served by the Khmelnytskyi Ruzhychna Airport. Khmelnytskyi's airport has a  concrete runway; at the airport there is a check point for crossing the state border of Ukraine.

Sports

Khmelnytskyi is home to the competitive football team FC Dynamo Khmelnytskyi.

Points of interest

Proskurivska street, a modern central pedestrian street of the city, preserved buildings of the end of the 19th - the beginnings of 20th century in the styles of modernist, eclecticisms, Baroque, stone (characteristic only for Proskuriv).
The house of the former Oleksiyivske real school (now it is the building of the City Executive Committee)
The house of O. Brusilov (now is the House of Ceremonial events)
The church of Nativity of the Virgin (the first stone construction in the city)
The Protection cathedral
St. George church
Andriy Pervozvannyi church in "Dubovo" district

Notable people 

 Nellie Casman (1896–1984) an actress and singer in Yiddish theatre in New York. 
 Ariel Durant (1898–1981) an American author and historian
 Svyatoslav Fyodorov (1927–2000) a Russian ophthalmologist, politician and professor
 Alberto Gerchunoff (1883–1950), Argentine author and journalist
 Max Husmann (1888–1965), Swiss peacemaker, helped Operation Sunrise in WWII
 Anatoly Kashpirovsky (born 1939, Russian psychotherapist and psychic healer
 Harry A. Marmer (1885–1953), American mathematician and oceanographer
 Jack Liebowitz (1900–2000), an American accountant and co-owner of what became DC Comics
 Mischa Mischakoff (1895–1981), American violinist, teacher, and conductor
 Oleksandr Ponomaryov (born 1973), Ukrainian singer
 Lesia Nikitiuk (born  1987), Ukrainian TV presenter
 Oksana Shachko (1987–2018), Ukrainian artist and activist with FEMEN
 Alexandra Shevchenko (born 1988), FEMEN activist
 Mikhail Tsekhanovsky (1889—1965) artist, animation director, book illustrator, screenwriter and sculptor. 
 Natalia Valevska (born 1981), Ukrainian pop and dance singer
 Alla Zahaikevych (born 1966) composer of contemporary classical music and performance artist. 
 Klemens Zamoyski (1738–1767) a Polish nobleman and 8th Ordynat of Zamość estate
 Tomasz Józef Zamoyski (1678–1725) a Polish nobleman and the 5th Ordynat of Zamość estate.

Sport 
 Vitaliy Balytskyi (1978–2018) a Ukrainian football player with 297 club caps
 Dmytro Bezotosnyi (born 1983) a Ukrainian football goalkeeper with over 300 club caps.
 Lyudmyla Holovchenko (born 1978) a retired amateur Ukrainian freestyle wrestler
 Dmytro Ianchuk (born 1992) sprint canoeist and bronze medallist at the 2016 Summer Olympics 
 Andriy Kirlik (born 1974) footballer with over 350 club caps and an ordained deacon 
 Ruslan Kostyshyn (born 1977) a Ukrainian retired footballer with 547 club caps
 Leonid Krupnik  (born 1979) an American-Israeli former soccer player with over 300 club caps, and current coach.
 Oksana Masters (born 1989), American Paralympic rower and cross-country skier
 Serhei Nahorny (born 1956) sprint canoeist, silver and gold medallist at the 1976 Summer Olympics
 Vita Palamar (born 1977) a female high jumper from Ukraine.
 Serhiy Petrenko (born 1956) sprint canoeist, twice gold medallist at the 1976 Summer Olympics
 Olga Polyuk (born 1987), freestyle skier, specializing in aerials, three time Olympian.
 Bohdan Shershun (born 1981), footballer with over 330 club caps and 4 for Ukraine

International relations

Twin towns — Sister cities
Khmelnytskyi is twinned with:

 Manises, España
 Modesto, United States (1987)
 Silistra, Bulgaria (1992)
 Bor, Serbia (1995)
 Bălți, Moldova (1996)
 Ciechanów, Poland (1996)
 Kramfors, Sweden (1997)
 Shijiazhuang, China (1998)
 Carmel, Israel (2007)

In January 2016 the Khmelnytskyi city council terminated its twinned relations with the Russian cities Tver and Ivanovo due to the Russian military intervention in Ukraine (2014–present).

Gallery

See also 

 List of cities in Ukraine

Notes

References

External links

 
 khmelnytsky.com  - Khmelnytskyi City Rada website
 Photos of Khmelnytskyi
 Khmelnytskyi Sights and Streets
 The murder of the Jews of Khmelnytskyi during World War II, at Yad Vashem website.
 
 

 
Cities in Khmelnytskyi Oblast
Cities of regional significance in Ukraine
Holocaust locations in Ukraine
Oblast centers in Ukraine
Populated places on the Southern Bug
15th-century establishments in Ukraine
Podolia Voivodeship
Proskurovsky Uyezd